fastText is a library for learning of word embeddings and text classification created by Facebook's AI Research (FAIR) lab. The model allows one to create an unsupervised learning or supervised learning algorithm for obtaining vector representations for words. Facebook makes available pretrained models for 294 languages. Several papers describe the techniques used by fastText.

See also 
 Word2vec
 GloVe
Neural Network
Natural Language Processing

References

External links 
 fastText
https://research.fb.com/downloads/fasttext/

Natural language processing software
Software using the BSD license